Stefan Dimić (born 1 May 1993) is a Serbian football midfielder who plays for Novi Pazar.

Club career
Dimić his started with Rad, but after he was loaned to Palić, he did not make any official appearance for Rad. Later he terminated the contract, and moved to Čukarički as a free agent at the beginning of 2014. Next he spent a period as a loaned player at Sinđelić Beograd, Dimić signed with Zemun in summer 2016.

References

External links
 
 Stefan Dimić stats at utakmica.rs
 
 
 

1993 births
People from Istog
Sportspeople from Peja
Kosovo Serbs
Living people
Serbian footballers
Association football midfielders
Serbia youth international footballers
FK Rad players
FK Palić players
FK Čukarički players
FK Sinđelić Beograd players
FK Zemun players
FK Mladost Lučani players
Balzan F.C. players
FK Novi Pazar players
Serbian First League players
Serbian SuperLiga players
Maltese Premier League players
Serbian expatriate footballers
Expatriate footballers in Malta
Serbian expatriate sportspeople in Malta